Angelo Adamo Gregucci (born 10 June 1964) is an Italian football coach and former player.

Career

Player
Born in San Giorgio Ionico, Province of Taranto, Gregucci started his playing career in 1981 with Taranto, before moving to Alessandria the following season, spending four seasons with the Piedmontese side. From 1986 to 1993 he played for Lazio, collecting a total of 187 Serie A appearances with the biancazzurri, being a mainstay for the Roman side. After a single season with Torino in 1993–94, he moved to Reggiana where he spent four seasons before retiring in 1998.

Coach
Gregucci started his coaching career in 2000 as Roberto Mancini's assistant at Fiorentina, and then briefly served as joint coach of Serie C1 side Viterbese during the 2001–02 season. He then joined Legnano of Serie C2 as head coach for the following season, ending it in eighth place. He was then appointed by Serie B team Venezia for the following season, but he failed to keep the lagunari away from the relegation zone as they ended in 20th place. He moved to Salernitana, another Serie B team, in the next season, leading them to a 14th place in the final table.

Gregucci started his 2005–06 season as Lecce coach in the Serie A, but was sacked after only five weeks due to poor results. He was head coach of Serie B team Vicenza since October 2006, when he was appointed to replace Giancarlo Camolese. Gregucci was confirmed as the new Atalanta B.C. head coach on 5 June, but was later sacked after losing all four games into the season.

On 3 October 2010 he was announced as new head coach of Serie B promotion hopefuls Sassuolo, taking over from Daniele Arrigoni. He is the head coach of the team, He was sacked, but after 2 weeks he was called back.

On 8 January 2012 he was announced as new head coach of Serie B promotion hopefuls Reggina, taking over from Roberto Breda. He was removed only three months later, on 15 April, following a 1–1 home draw with Crotone, with Breda being reinstantiated at his place.

From 8 August 2012 he worked at Manchester City to fill the role of technical assistant.

On 18 July 2016, Inter Milan announced that Gregucci had been appointed as assistant coach till 30 June 2017.

He rejoined Mancini in 2018 as assistant for the Italian national team, a position he held until December 2018, when he returned to Salernitana (now in Serie B) for the third time in his career as the club's head coach. On 6 May 2019, Gregucci was relieved by the club due to bad results.

On 24 January 2020, he was hired by Alessandria for a second time. After completing the 2019–20 Serie C in fifth place and then being eliminated in the round of 16 of the promotion playoffs, he was confirmed for the new season, but was removed from his managerial duties on 21 January 2021, with the club in fourth place and eleven points behind first-placed Renate.
He will be added to Esteghlal's technical staff.

References

1964 births
Living people
Sportspeople from the Province of Taranto
Association football defenders
Italian footballers
Italian football managers
U.S. Alessandria Calcio 1912 players
S.S. Lazio players
Torino F.C. players
A.C. Reggiana 1919 players
Serie A players
Serie B players
Venezia F.C. managers
U.S. Salernitana 1919 managers
U.S. Lecce managers
L.R. Vicenza managers
U.S. Sassuolo Calcio managers
Reggina 1914 managers
Manchester City F.C. non-playing staff
Leyton Orient F.C. non-playing staff
U.S. Alessandria Calcio 1912 managers
Serie A managers
Serie B managers
Serie C managers
Footballers from Apulia
Association football coaches